Quest Atlantis (QA) was a 3D multiuser, computer graphics learning environment that utilized a narrative programming toolkit to immerse children, ages 9–16, in meaningful inquiry tasks. Quest Atlantis combined strategies used in the commercial gaming environment with lessons from educational research on learning and motivation. The project was unique in its goals to combine the best aspects of learning, playing, and helping, as a means to motivate and engage students. It allowed users to travel to virtual places to perform educational activities (known as Quests), talk with other users and mentors, and build virtual personae. The project was intended to engage children ages 9–16 in a form of transformational play comprising both online and off-line learning activities, with a storyline inspiring a disposition towards social action. More than sugar-coating content to coerce dis-empowered students into caring about disciplinary knowledge, the goal of Quest Atlantis was to establish educational worlds where children become empowered scientists, doctors, reporters, and mathematicians who have to understand disciplinary content to accomplish desired ends.

Over the five-year span, more than 65,000 children on five continents have participated in the project. Quest Atlantis has demonstrated learning gains in things like science, language arts, and social studies, and students have completed thousands of Quests, some of which were assigned by teachers and many of which were chosen by students to complete in their free time. Equally important have been reported personal experiences, with teachers and students reporting increased levels of engagement and interest in pursuing the curricular issues outside of school. Students and teachers conduct rich inquiry-based explorations through which they learn particular standards-based content, and at the same time develop pro-social attitudes regarding significant environmental and social issues (see Critical Design Article). Rather than just placing work and play side-by-side, QA strived to make learning fun and to show children how they can make a difference.

The principal investigator was Sasha Barab, Associate Professor in Learning Sciences, who is now at Arizona State University Center for Games and Impact. Other faculty members that played prominent roles on the project included Dan Hickey at Indiana University-Bloomington and Melissa Gresalfi at Vanderbilt University. Users of QA came together from all over the world.

This educational game was redesigned in 2012 with the help of funding from the Bill and Melinda Gates Foundation and re-released as Atlantis Remixed.

See also
Active Worlds
Simulated reality

References
Siyahhan, S., Barab, S. A., & James, C. (in press). Youth and the ethics of identity play in virtual spaces. To appear in the Interactive Journal of Learning Research.
Barab, S.A., Gresalfi, M.S., & Ingram-Goble, A. (2010). Transformational play: Using games to position person, content, and context. Educational Researcher, 39(7), 525-536.
Barab, S.A., Dodge, T., Ingram-Goble, A., Peppler, K., Pettyjohn, P., Volk, C.,& Solomou, M. (2010). Pedagogical dramas and transformational play: Narratively-rich games for learning. Mind, Culture, and Activity 17(3): 235–264.
Barab, S.A., Gresalfi, M.S., Dodge, T., & Ingram-Goble, A. (2010). Narratizing Disciplines and Disciplinizing Narratives: Games as 21st Century Curriculum. International Journal for Gaming and Computer-Mediated Simulations, 2(1). 17-30.
 Barab, S. A., Gresalfi, M., & Arici, A. (2009). Why educators should care about games. Educational Leadership 67(1), pp. 76-80.
 Warren, S., Stein, R. A., Dondlinger, M. J., & Barab, S. A. (2009). A look inside a MUVE design process: Blending instructional design and game principles to target writing skills. Journal of Educational Computing Research,40(3), 295-321.
 Barab, S. A., Scott, B., Siyahhan, S. Goldstone, R., Ingram-Goble, A., Zuiker, S., & Warren, S. (2009). Conceptual play as a curricular scaffold: Using videogames to support science education. Journal of Science Education and Technology, 18(1), 305-320.
Thomas, M., K., Barab, S. A., & Tuzun, H. (2009). Developing critical implementations of technology-rich innovations: A cross-case study of the implementation of Quest Atlantis. Journal of Educational Computing Research, 41(2), 125-153.
 Hickey, D., Ingram-Goble, A., & Jameson, E. (2009). Designing Assessments and Assessing Designs in Virtual Educational Environments. Journal of Science Education and Technology, 18, 187-208.
 Dodge, T., Barab, S., Stuckey, B., Warren, S., Heiselt, C., & Stein, R.   (2008). Children’s   sense of self: Learning and meaning in the digital age. Journal of   Interactive Learning Research, 19(2), 225–249..
 Barab, S., Warren, S., & Ingram-Goble, A. (2008). Conceptual play spaces. In R. Ferdig (Ed.), Handbook of Research on Effective Electronic Gaming in Education (pp. 1–20). Hershey, Pennsylvania: IGI Global publications.
 Barab, S., Dodge, T., Tuzun, H., Job-Sluder, K., Jackson, C., Arici, A.,   Job-Sluder, L., Carteaux, R., Jr., Gilbertson, J., & Heiselt, C. (2007). The   Quest Atlantis Project: A socially-responsive play space for learning. In B.   E. Shelton & D. Wiley (Eds.), The Educational Design and Use of Simulation   Computer Games (pp. 159–186). Rotterdam, The Netherlands: Sense Publishers.
 Warren, S., Barab, S. A., & Dondlinger, M. J. (2008). A MUVE Towards PBL Writing: Effects of a digital learning environment designed to improve elementary student writing. Journal of Research on Technology in Education,41(1), 121-147.
 Barab, S. A., Dodge, T., Thomas, M, Jackson, C., & Tuzun, H. (2007). Our   designs and the social agendas they carry. Journal of the Learning   Sciences,16(2), 263-305.
 Barab, S. A., Zuiker, S., Warren, S., Hickey, D., Ingram-Goble, A., Kwon,   E-J., Kouper, I., & Herring, S. C. (2007). Situationally   embodied curriculum: Relating formalisms to contexts. Science   Education, 91(5), 750-592.
 Barab, S. A., Sadler, T., Heiselt, C., Hickey, D., & Zuiker, S. (2007). Relating   narrative, inquiry, and inscriptions: A framework for socio-scientific   inquiry. Journal of Science Education and Technology, 16(1), 59-82.
 Barab, S, A., & Dede, C. (2007).  Games and immersive participatory simulations for science education: An  emerging type of curricula. Journal of  Science Education and Technology, 16(1),  1-3.
 Barab, S. A. (2006).  A   methodological toolkit for the learning sciences. In K. Sawyer (ed.)   Handbook of the Learning Sciences (pp. 153–170), Cambridge, MA: Cambridge   University Press.
 Sadler, T.D., Barab, S.A., & Scott, B. (2006). What   do students gain by engaging in socioscientific inquiry? Research in   Science Education.
 Barab, S. A., Jackson, C., & Piekarsky, E. (2006). Embedded professional   development: Learning through enacting innovation. In C. Dede (Ed.), Online   professional development for teachers: Emerging models & methods (pp. 155–174). Cambridge, MA: Harvard Educational Press.
 Barab, S. & Jackson, C. (2006, January 20). From Plato’s Republic to   Quest Atlantis: The role of the philosopher-king. THEN: Journal (Technology,   Humanities, Education, Narrative), 2 Article 2. Retrieve from THEN.
 Lim, C., Nonis, D., & Hedberg, J. (2006). Gaming in a 3D multiuser   virtual environment: Engaging students in science lessons. British Journal of   Educational Technology, 37(2), 211-231.
 Tuzun, H. (2006). Egitsel   bilgisayar oyunlari ve bir örnek: Quest Atlantis (Educational computer games and   a case: Quest Atlantis).Hacettepe Universitesi Egitim Fakültesi Dergisi,   30, 220-229.
 Young, M. F., Schrader, P. G., & Zheng, D. (2006, April 1). MMOGs as   learning environments: An ecological journey into Quest Atlantis and Sims   Online. Innovate: Journal of Online Education, 2(4).
 Barab, S. A., Arici, A., & Jackson, C. (2005). Eat   your vegetables and do your homework: A design-based investigation of enjoyment   and meaning in learning. Educational Technology 45(1), 15-21.
 Barab, S., Thomas, M., Dodge, T., Carteaux, R., & Tuzun, H. (2005). Making learning fun: Quest Atlantis, a game without guns. Educational Technology   Research and Development, 53(1), 86-107.
 Barab, S. A., Thomas, M., Dodge, T., Squire, K., & Newell, M. (2004). Critical   design ethnography: Designing for change. Anthropology & Education   Quarterly, 35(2), 254-268.
 Borner, K., & Penumarthy, S. (2003). Social diffusion patterns in   three-dimensional virtual worlds. Information Visualization, 2003(2),
 Li, H., (2010). Applicable science and technology in three-dimensional, and phantasmagorical and illusional worlds, Science and Aerospace 182-198.

Footnotes

External links
 Quest Atlantis
 Atlantis Remixed

Children's educational video games
Video games developed in the United States